Karbas is a rural locality (a village) in Beloyevskoye Rural Settlement, Kudymkarsky District, Perm Krai, Russia. The population was 153 as of 2010. There are 7 streets.

Geography 
Karbas is located 26 km north of Kudymkar (the district's administrative centre) by road. Ilyichi is the nearest rural locality.

References 

Rural localities in Kudymkarsky District